, or  with the honorific , is a traditional Japanese dessert.

There are two types of  based on different methods of cooking azuki beans. Azuki beans may be turned into paste, crushed without keeping their original shape, or a mix of paste and roughly crushed beans. In Western Japan,  refers to a type of  made from a mixture of paste and crushed beans. Other toppings, such as sweetened condensed milk, are occasionally added for flavor.

See also 
 Hong dou tang
 Patjuk

References 

Japanese desserts and sweets
Legume dishes
Japanese words and phrases